Otabek Shukurov (born 22 June 1996) is an Uzbek professional footballer who plays as a midfielder for Fatih Karagümrük in Süper Lig and the Uzbekistan national team.

Club career
Shukurov joined FK Mash'al Mubarek in 2014 and made his league debut against PFK Metallurg Bekabad on 21 June 2014. On 1 January 2015, he moved to FC Bunyodkor but he played only 2 league games in there, so he transferred to FK Buxoro on 15 July 2015. He had successful season in FK Buxoro by playing 14 games and scoring 2 goals and returned to FC Bunyodkor on 1 January 2016.

International career
Shukurov has represented his country at various age groups. He made his Uzbekistan national football team debut against Lebanon on 14 February 2016. In that match, Uzbekistan won by a score of 2-0.

Career statistics

Club

International

Statistics accurate as of match played 20 November 2022

International goals
Scores and results list Uzbekistan's goal tally first.

References

1996 births
Living people
Association football midfielders
Uzbekistani footballers
FC Bunyodkor players
Sharjah FC players
UAE Pro League players
Uzbekistan Super League players
Uzbekistani expatriate sportspeople in the United Arab Emirates
Expatriate footballers in the United Arab Emirates
2019 AFC Asian Cup players
Uzbekistan international footballers
People from Qashqadaryo Region